Iclod is a commune in Cluj County, Transylvania, Romania. It is composed of five villages: Fundătura (Szamosjenő), Iclod, Iclozel (Kisiklód), Livada (Dengeleg) and Orman (Ormány).

Demographics 
According to the census from 2002 there was a total population of 4,420 people living in this commune. Of this population, 95.11% are ethnic Romanians, 2.55% are ethnic Hungarians and 2.26% ethnic Romani.

Natives
Ioan Bob
Gheorghe Moceanu

References 

General
Atlasul localităților județului Cluj (Cluj County Localities Atlas), Suncart Publishing House, Cluj-Napoca, 

Communes in Cluj County
Localities in Transylvania